The 2011 Big East football season was the NCAA football season of the Big East Conference.

The conference consists of 8 football members:  Cincinnati, Connecticut, Louisville, Pittsburgh, Rutgers, South Florida, Syracuse, and West Virginia.

Regular season

Key

All times Eastern time.

Week 1

Week 2

Week 3

Week 4

Week 5

Week 6

Week 7

Week 8

Week 9

Week 10

Week 11

Week 12

Week 13

Week 14

Bowl Games

Records against other conferences

References

External links